The Overseas Workers Welfare Administration (abbreviated as OWWA) is an attached agency of the Department of Migrant Workers of the Philippines. It protects the interests of Overseas Filipino Workers and their families, providing social security, cultural services and help with employment, remittances and legal matters. It is funded by an obligatory annual contribution from overseas workers and their employers. The agency was founded in 1977 as the Welfare and Training Fund for Overseas Workers. Its head office is at F.B. Harrison Street corner 7th Street in Pasay, near EDSA Extension, Philippines.

See also
Brain drain in the Philippines
Commission on Filipinos Overseas
Philippine Labor Migration Policy
Philippine Overseas Employment Administration

References

External links

Republic Act No. 8042
Republic Act No. 10022
Republic Act No. 10801

Department of Labor and Employment (Philippines)
Overseas Filipino Worker